The Confederación Sudamericana de Rugby (CONSUR) Championship C Division Championship took place between 5-11 October 2014 at Ciudad Deportiva Kiwanis in Clayton, Panama.  This was the third time CONSUR has run a 3rd division championship.

Panama hosted Costa Rica, Guatemala and El Salvador, with the tournament played over three game days.  

The tournament draw was conducted in the following manner:
Day 1 - Costa Rica v Panama, Guatemala v El Salvador
Day 2 - Winner Costa Rica/Panama v Loser Guatemala/El Salvador, Winner Guatemala/El Salvador v Loser Costa Rica/Panama
Day 3 - Final (1st place v 2nd place), 3rd place playoff (3rd place v 4th place)

However, after the results of Day 2, which would have resulted in a repeat of the games of Day 1 on Day 3, Day 3 was changed to the third round robin game, with no final.

As a result of winning the tournament, El Salvador won the right to host the 2015 South American Rugby Championship "C".

2014 CONSUR C Championship

Match Schedule

Related Page 
 2014 South American Rugby Championship "A"
 2014 South American Rugby Championship "B"

References 

2014
2014 rugby union tournaments for national teams
C
rugby union
rugby union
rugby union
rugby union
rugby union
rugby union